Lexy Ramler (born February 6, 1999) is an American artistic gymnast. An international elite for 3 years, she currently competes for the Minnesota Golden Gophers women's gymnastics team.

Career
She tied with UCLA's Kyla Ross for second in the all-around at the 2019 NCAA Women's Gymnastics Championship. She also broke the Minnesota school record in the all-around during the 2019 season, scoring a 39.725 against the Maryland Terrapins. On April 21, 2021, Ramler was awarded the AAI Award.

Competitive History

Career perfect 10.0

References 

Living people
1999 births
American female artistic gymnasts
Minnesota Golden Gophers women's gymnasts
University of Minnesota alumni
NCAA gymnasts who have scored a perfect 10